Matt Applebaum (born January 20, 1984) is an American football offensive line coach who most recently served as the offensive line coach for the Miami Dolphins of the National Football League (NFL).
He previously served as the offensive line coach for Boston College. Applebaum played college football at UConn, where he started on the offensive line for two years.

Coaching career
Applebaum started his coaching career at Central Connecticut State University, where he was the tight ends coach. He spent five months there before leaving for the NFL, joining the Washington Redskins in 2008 as a player personnel/coaching assistant. In 2011, Applebaum departed the Redskins to become an offensive graduate assistant/quality control coach for the University of Miami.
He spent two years there before being hired as the offensive line coach at Bucknell University in 2013. In 2014, Applebaum returned to the NFL to become an offensive assistant for the Jacksonville Jaguars. He left the Jaguars in 2015 to become the offensive line coach at Southeastern Louisiana University. In 2016, Applebaum became the offensive line coach at Davidson College. The next year, he was promoted to offensive coordinator while continuing to serve as the offensive line coach. Applebaum was hired by Towson University in 2018 to be their offensive line coach.
In 2020, he became a part of Boston College's staff as their offensive line coach.

Dolphins
On February 12, 2022, it was announced that Applebaum would be leaving Boston College to become the offensive line coach of the Miami Dolphins. On February 2, 2023, the Dolphins parted ways with Applebaum.

References 

Living people
Miami Dolphins coaches
1984 births
People from Yardley, Pennsylvania
UConn Huskies football players
American football offensive linemen
Central Connecticut Blue Devils football coaches
Washington Redskins coaches
Miami Hurricanes football coaches
Bucknell Bison football coaches
Jacksonville Jaguars coaches
Southeastern Louisiana Lions football coaches
Davidson Wildcats football coaches
Towson Tigers football coaches
Boston College Eagles football coaches